Feds is an American legal drama television series that aired on CBS from March 5, 1997 to April 9, 1997. It was created by Dick Wolf, and starred Blair Brown and Dylan Baker. Michael S. Chernuchin was also an executive producer for the project. The series is notable for being the first to air in letterboxed 16:9 in the United States.

Cast
Blair Brown as Erica Stanton
Regina Taylor as Sandra Broome
John Slattery as Michael Mancini
Adrian Pasdar as C. Oliver Resor
Grace Phillips as Jessica Graham
Dylan Baker as Jack Gaffney
George DiCenzo as Tony Garufi

Episodes

References

External links

1990s American drama television series
1990s American legal television series
1997 American television series debuts
1997 American television series endings
CBS original programming
Television series created by Dick Wolf
Television series by Wolf Films
 Television shows set in New York City
Television series about prosecutors